Rhinophis roshanpererai, the Roshan Perera's shieldtail or Roshan Perera's rhinophis, is a species of snake in the family Uropeltidae. It is endemic to Sri Lanka. The species was first described from three specimens taken from Badulla District. The species lack pale stripes and possess three to four prominent spines with a small shield-tail.

Etymolohy
The specific name roshanpererai was named in honor of deceased Roshan Perera, who was a reptile instructor at Young Zoologist's Association of Sri Lanka, Department of National Zoological Gardens.

References

roshanpererai
Snakes of Asia
Reptiles of Sri Lanka
Endemic fauna of Sri Lanka
Reptiles described in 2017
Taxa named by Mendis Wickramasinghe